"Pastime Paradise" is a song by American musician Stevie Wonder, from the 1976 album Songs in the Key of Life. The song was one of the first to use a synthesizer (the Yamaha GX-1) to sound like a full string section. Built initially from synth tracks rather than from a drummer setting the basic rhythm, the song is augmented with rhythm performances from Ray Maldonado, Bobbye Hall, and Wonder, and a persistent "chinging" bell pattern by Hare Krishna musicians. A gospel choir from West Angeles Church of God and Hare Krishna chanting group culminate in a multicultural finale.

Meaning
Steve Lodder writes that listeners may understand the song in one of two ways. One way is the comparison and contrast of the difference between the negative attitude of someone with a flawed past, and the positive outlook of someone who wishes for a perfect future in this life or the next. The other way is a description of how selfish materialism and laziness cannot compare to a strong work ethic which brings the great reward of Heaven.

Covers and sampling 

Coolio's "Gangsta's Paradise" (and its parody, "Amish Paradise" by Weird Al Yankovic), Mary J. Blige's "Time", Basta (Noggano)'s "Russian Paradise", Blue's "Curtain Falls" and Scarface's "Crack" each sample the song. Patti Smith, Youngblood Brass Band, Chick Corea, Sunlightsquare, Rainer Ptacek, Ray Barretto, and Martik have recorded covers of the song. Eläkeläiset, a Finnish humppa-rock band, did a humorous Finnish-language parody on their 5th studio album Werbung, Baby! (1999).. IAM also sampled the song in "Tam Tam de l'Afrique" at the chorus.

References

Songs written by Stevie Wonder
Stevie Wonder songs
1976 songs
Song recordings produced by Stevie Wonder